The 2014–15 season was Carlisle United F.C.'s first campaign in back in the fourth tier of English football, League Two After Relegation From League One The Previous Season. The club finished 20th.

Pre-season
The pre-season friendlies for the club were announced 25 June 2014.

League Two

League table

Results by matchday

Matches
The fixtures for the 2014–15 season were announced on 18 June 2014 at 9am.

FA Cup

Carling Cup 

The draw for the first round was made on 17 June 2014 at 10am. Carlisle United were drawn at home to Derby County.

Johnstone's Paint Trophy

Transfers

Squad statistics

 
 

 

           

 
 
 
 

 
|}

Top scorers

Disciplinary record

References 

Carlisle United F.C. seasons
Carlisle United